Villa Louvigny is a building in Luxembourg City, in southern Luxembourg, that served as the headquarters of Compagnie Luxembourgeoise de Télédiffusion, the forerunner of RTL Group.  It is located in Municipal Park, in the Ville Haute quarter of the centre of the city.

History
Built in 1920 on a site that before had been the Louvigny fort of the old fortress of Luxembourg, it was named after Jean Charles de Landas, Count of Louvigny, who was chief engineer and interim governor of the fortress in the 1670s. The building was rented to the Compagnie Luxembourgeoise de Télédiffusion, who eventually bought the building in 1936. In 1991 the administrative offices moved to a new building on the Kirchberg plateau, followed by the technical installations in 1996. The philharmonic orchestra of Luxembourg remained in the facilities until 2005 when the Philharmony building was finished.
 
Villa Louvigny has hosted the Eurovision Song Contest twice, in 1962 and 1966.

Since the year 2000 the Villa Louvigny is the main seat of the ministry of Health.

See also
Radio Luxembourg

References

External links

Music venues in Luxembourg City
Television in Luxembourg